Owli-ye Jonubi (also Romanized as Owlī-ye Jonūbī; also known as Olī-ye Jonūbī) is a village in Howmeh Rural District, in the Central District of Deyr County, Bushehr Province, Iran. At the 2006 census, its population was 311, in 62 families.

References 

Populated places in Deyr County